Mohakhali DOHS is a neighborhood of Dhaka for Armed Forces Officers. The neighborhoods belong in the Dhaka North City Corporation.

History 
The area was established in the mid 1980s as part of the Defence Officers' Housing Scheme and has 536 individual housing plots. The administration falls under Dhaka Cantonment and the cantonment board. There is a mosque inside the DOHS.

References 

Neighbourhoods in Dhaka
Dhaka
DOHSes in Dhaka